Dan Chmielinski, also known as "Chimy" (shim'-ee), (born December 28, 1993) is an American jazz bassist, synthesist and composer.

Biography

Early life
Raised in Glenview, Illinois, Chmielinski began playing bass at age three, initially utilizing a toddler-sized acoustic bass his parents created using a half-size cello with bass guitar strings. He attended Glenbrook South High School in Glenview, Illinois. He completed both undergraduate and graduate studies in music at the Juilliard School in New York City.

Musical career

He has worked extensively as a member of pianist Joey Alexander's trio alongside drummer Ulysses Owens and was featured on Alexander's second album Countdown, released in September 2016. 
He has performed as a member of the  Jazz at Lincoln Center Orchestra featuring Wynton Marsalis, and has also worked with artists including Brad Mehldau, Chase Baird, Eric Harland, Antonio Sánchez, Nir Felder, Jeff "Tain" Watts, Mark Sherman, Dan Tepfer, Steve Lyman, Sammy Miller, Bryan Carter and others.

His initial work as a bandleader focused on the ensemble Four by Four, which featured combined jazz quartet and string quartet.  In mid-2018, Chmielinski formed the electro-acoustic band Circuit Kisser, featuring Electronic Wind Instrumentalist Chase Baird, keyboardist Mathis Picard and drummer Diego Ramirez.

In December 2019, Chmielinski collaborated with vocalist Martina DaSilva to release the winter holiday-inspired album A Very ChimyTina Christmas.  While the album primarily featured Chmielinski and DaSilva in a duo format, several tracks incorporate individual guest artists including saxophonist Lucas Pino, guitarist Gabe Schnider, vibraphonist Joel Ross and bassist Ben Wolfe. The album encompassed ten classic standards including Wham's "Last Christmas" and "When You Wish Upon a Star" as well as the original composition "Diamonds and Pearls".

Chmielinski has composed music for film, including the 2016 documentary Sacred by director Thomas Lennon.  He also composed for director Connor Smith's 2015 film Smoke in the Air and 2016 documentary Shakespeare at the Point. In 2017, Dan was one of 8 composers selected to participate in BMI’s, “Composing for the Screen” film scoring mentorship, under the guidance of acclaimed media composer Rick Baitz.

Chmielinski plays and endorses Pirastro Eudoxa strings.

Discography

As leader

As sideman

References

External links 

1993 births
Living people
American jazz double-bassists
Male double-bassists
American jazz composers
Juilliard School alumni
21st-century double-bassists
21st-century American male musicians